Complement receptor type 2 (CR2), also known as complement C3d receptor, Epstein-Barr virus receptor, and CD21 (cluster of differentiation 21), is a protein that in humans is encoded by the CR2 gene.

CR2 is involved in the complement system. It binds to iC3b (inactive derivative of C3b), C3dg, or C3d. B cells express CR2 receptors on their surfaces, allowing the complement system to play a role in B-cell activation and maturation.

Interactions

Complement receptor 2 interacts with CD19, and, on mature B cells, forms a complex with CD81 (TAPA-1). The CR2-CD19-CD81 complex is often called the B cell co-receptor complex, because CR2 binds to opsonized antigens through attached C3d (or iC3b or C3dg) when the B-cell receptor binds antigen. This results in the B cell having greatly enhanced response to the antigen.

Epstein-Barr virus (EBV) can bind CR2, enabling EBV to enter and infect B cells.  Yefenof et al. (1976) found complete overlapping of EBV receptors and C3 receptors on human B cells.

Isoforms

The canonical Cr2/CD21 gene of subprimate mammals produces two types of complement receptor (CR1, ca. 200 kDa; CR2, ca. 145 kDa) via alternative mRNA splicing. The murine Cr2 gene contains 25 exons; a common first exon is spliced to exon 2 and to exon 9 in transcripts encoding CR1 and CR2, respectively. A transcript with an open reading frame of 4,224 nucleotides encodes the long isoform, CR1; this is predicted to be a protein of 1,408 amino acids that includes 21 short consensus repeats (SCR) of ca. 60 amino acids each, plus transmembrane and cytoplasmic regions. Isoform CR2 (1,032 amino acids) is encoded by a shorter transcript (3,096 coding nucleotides) that lacks exons 2-8 encoding SCR1-6. CR1 and CR2 on murine B cells form complexes with a co-accessory activation complex containing CD19, CD81, and the fragilis/Ifitm (murine equivalents of LEU13) proteins.

The CR2 gene of primates produces only the smaller isoform, CR2; primate complement receptor 1, which recapitulates many of the structural domains and presumed functions of Cr2-derived CR1 in subprimates, is encoded by a distinct CR1 gene (apparently derived from the gene Crry of subprimates).

Isoforms CR1 and CR2 derived from the non-primate Cr2 locus possess the same C-terminal sequence, such that association with and activation through CD19 should be equivalent. CR1 can bind to C4b and C3b complexes, whereas CR2 (murine and human) binds to C3dg-bound complexes. CR1, a surface protein produced primarily by follicular dendritic cells, appears to be critical for generation of appropriately activated B cells of the germinal centre and for mature antibody responses to bacterial infection.

Immunohistochemistry

Although CR2 is present on all mature B-cells and follicular dendritic cells (FDCs), this becomes readily apparent only when immunohistochemistry is performed on frozen sections. In more conventional paraffin-embedded tissue samples, only the FDCs retain the staining pattern. As a result, CR2, more commonly called CD21 in the context of immunohistochemistry, can be used to demonstrate the FDC meshwork in lymphoid tissue.

This feature can be useful in examining tissue where the normal germinal centres have been effaced by disease processes, such as HIV infection. The pattern of the FDC meshwork may also be altered in some neoplastic conditions, such as B-cell MALT lymphomas, mantle cell lymphoma, follicular lymphoma and some T cell lymphomas. Castleman's disease is typified by the presence of abnormal FDCs, and both this, and malignant FDC tumours may therefore be demonstrated using CR2/CD21 antibodies.

References

Further reading

External links
 

Complement system